Guillaume-Antoine Delfaud (1733–1792) was a French Jesuit.

References

1733 births
1792 deaths
French beatified people
18th-century French Jesuits
French clergy killed in the French Revolution